"Into My Arms" is a song written by Nick Cave, and released as the first single from Nick Cave and the Bad Seeds' tenth studio album The Boatman's Call in 1997. The single, released on 27 January 1997, was pressed on 7" vinyl, as well as a standard CD single. A promotional music video for the song was also recorded.

Background and history
The song takes the form of a love ballad, with a piano and an electric bass as the sole instruments used. Music journalist and critic Toby Creswell included "Into My Arms" in his book 1001 Songs: The Great Songs of All Time and the Artists, Stories and Secrets Behind Them, in which he attributed the song's melancholic lyrics to the break-up of Cave's long-term relationship with Viviane Carneiro and his subsequent brief relationship and break-up with English musician PJ Harvey. In Cave's lecture "The Secret Life of the Love Song" to the Academy of Fine Arts Vienna, he counts the song among those he is most proud of having written.

Cave said he wrote the song in rehab: "I was actually walking back from church through the fields, and the tune came into my head, and when I got back to the facility I sat down at the cranky old piano and wrote the melody and chords, then went up to the dormitory, sat on my bed and wrote those lyrics."

Cave performed the song at the funeral of his friend, INXS singer Michael Hutchence, but requested the cameras recording the service be switched off as he performed.

Reception
The song was also nominated for Single of the Year at the 1997 ARIA Awards, and came No. 18 in the Triple J Hottest 100 of that year. It was No. 84 in the 1998 Hottest 100 of All Time, and No. 36 in the 2009 Hottest 100 of All Time.

Music video
The song's music video was directed by British director Jonathan Glazer. In an interview on the DVD The Work of Director Jonathan Glazer, Nick Cave praised the video as well-produced, but said he considered it a poor fit with the song as the video's depressing imagery overrode the melancholic optimism Cave had intended the song to convey.

Track listings
UK CD single (Mute Records, CD MUTE 192)
"Into My Arms" – 4:15
"Little Empty Boat" – 4:25
"Right Now I'm A-Roaming" – 4:21

UK 7-inch single (Mute Records, MUTE 192)
"Into My Arms" – 4:15
"Little Empty Boat" – 4:25

Charts

Certifications

Cover versions
"Into My Arms" was also recorded by Ane Brun and Roger Daltrey. In 2012, American artist Eliza Rickman included a cover on her second album, O, You Sinners. In 2017, Shelby Lynne and Allison Moorer also recorded the song for their album Not Dark Yet. It has also been covered by Band of Horses. In 2021, American psychedelic rock band The Flaming Lips and singer Nell Smith released Where the Viaduct Looms, a collaborative album of Nick Cave covers that included a rendition of "Into My Arms."
In 2022, the interdisciplinary artist Hayden Dunham released a cover of the song, under their Hyd moniker.

Other appearances in popular media
"Into My Arms" featured in the films Zero Effect (1998), the television film On the Beach (2000), He Died with a Felafel in His Hand (2001), Gettin' Square (2003), and About Time (2013). It has also appeared in The L Word episode "Luck, Next Time", series 4, episode 7 of British teen drama Skins, series 1, episode 5 of the Australian detective show City Homicide, John Patrick Shanley's 2012 play Storefront Church and series 1, episode 8 of The Mist. The song is also the closing track of the 2017 Paddy Considine film Journeyman. The song is also used in the 2015 BBC series Uncle at the end of the fifth episode of season two as well as appearing in the third episode of the Ricky Gervais 2019 Netflix series After Life. The song is also used as a trans-diegetic sound in the 2019 TV series War of the Worlds. "Into My Arms" also appears in the closing credits of the Australian TV series Mr Inbetween (season 3 episode 6).

References

External links
Nick Cave performs Into My Arms, BBC Four Sessions (iPlayer)

Nick Cave songs
1997 singles
Music videos directed by Jonathan Glazer
Mute Records singles
Rock ballads
Songs written by Nick Cave